Calicut, the former name for Kozhikode may refer to:

Places
India
 Former state on Malabar Coast, India ruled by Zamorins (Also see History of Kozhikode)
 Kozhikode, Kerala state, India
 Kozhikode district, Kerala